Kyrgyz-Ata Nature Park is a national park in Nookat District of Osh Region of Kyrgyzstan, established in March 1992. It covers 11,172 hectares. The purpose of the park is conservation of the valuable unique nature complex of juniper forests of special ecological, aesthetic, geobotanical and faunal value and using it for recreation. It is located 40 km from Osh.

The national park is located on the northern slopes of the Alay Range and in the basin of the river Kyrgyz-Ata (a tributary of the Aravansay), which flows from the northern slope of the Kichik-Alay ridge, whose rocks are composed of limestone with outcrops of multicolored marble.

References

Protected areas established in 1992
National parks of Kyrgyzstan